Jeremiah Collison (12 August 1889 – 18 June 1956) was an Irish hurler and Gaelic footballer. Usually lining out in the backs, he was a member of the Tipperary team that won the 1916 All-Ireland Championship.

Collison began his club hurling with the Toomevara club, winning four championship medals between 1910 and 1914. He also played club hurling with Nenagh Éire Óg, Collegians and Moneygall.

After lining out for the Dublin senior team in the drawn All-Ireland final with Tipperary in 1908, Collison subsequently joined the Tipperary team in 1915. He won his first Munster medal in 1916 before later winning his sole All-Ireland medal after Tipperary's defeat of Kilkenny in the final. He won a second Munster medal in 1917.

Collison also had an active role as a member of the Old IRA. Appointed O/C of the No.2 Battalion North Tipperary Brigade IRA in 1918, his hurling career ended when he was imprisoned in Belfast for drilling members of the IRA. During his time at Crumlin Jail, Collison went on hunger strike. A supporter of the Anglo-Irish Treaty, Collison later served as a member of the Free State Army during the Civil War.

Honours

Toomevara
Tipperary Senior Hurling Championship (4): 1910, 1912, 1913, 1914

Tipperary
All-Ireland Senior Hurling Championship (1): 1916
Munster Senior Hurling Championship (2): 1916, 1917

References

1889 births
1956 deaths
Toomevara hurlers
Moneygall hurlers
Nenagh Éire Óg Gaelic footballers
Tipperary inter-county hurlers
Tipperary inter-county Gaelic footballers
Dublin hurlers
All-Ireland Senior Hurling Championship winners